Ernest Edward "Tiny" Bonham (August 16, 1913 – September 15, 1949) was an American professional baseball pitcher in Major League Baseball (MLB). From 1940 to 1949, he played for the New York Yankees (1940–1946) and Pittsburgh Pirates (1947–1949). Bonham, who batted and threw right-handed, won 21 games for the Yankees in 1942.

Career
In a 10-season career, Bonham posted a 103–72 (.589) record with 478 strikeouts and a 3.06 ERA in 1,551 innings pitched.

Bonham kept opposing batters off balance with an assortment of deliveries. He started his professional baseball career with the Oakland Oaks of the Pacific Coast League in 1935. He worked his way up through the New York Yankees minor league system until 1940, when he was summoned from Triple-A Kansas City to anchor a weak Yankees pitching staff.

Remaining with the Yankees until , Bonham was a pitching mainstay of manager Joe McCarthy's pennant-winning combinations between 1941 and 1943. Bonham supplied his team with the decisive complete game 4-hit 3–1 victory over the Brooklyn Dodgers in Game Five of the 1941 World Series played at Ebbets Field. But Bonham was ill-fated in his other Series starts, losing to the St. Louis Cardinals in 1942 and 1943, both times by 4–3 scores. His most productive season came in 1942, when he led the American League with 21 wins, six shutouts, 22 complete games and a .808 winning percentage. He made the All-Star team that season and again in 1943.

Hampered by a chronic back ailment during his last few years with the Yankees, which were interrupted by a brief time in the Army in 1944, Bonham was sent to the Pittsburgh Pirates before the 1947 season. Although his physical condition was such that he could not be counted on regularly, Bonham provided three solid seasons for the Pirates.

After a 1–4 start in 1949, Bonham won six straight games for a floundering Pittsburgh club, including an 8–2 victory over the Philadelphia Phillies on August 27, his final game. Nineteen days later Bonham died in Pittsburgh, Pennsylvania, at the age of 36, following an appendectomy and stomach surgery.

See also
 List of baseball players who died during their careers

References

External links

Tiny Bonham - Baseballbiography.com

1913 births
1949 deaths
Akron Yankees players
American League All-Stars
Baseball players from California
Binghamton Triplets players
Major League Baseball pitchers
Kansas City Blues (baseball) players
People from Amador County, California
New York Yankees players
Newark Bears (IL) players
Oakland Oaks (baseball) players
Pittsburgh Pirates players
United States Army personnel of World War II